Jerry Bradley may refer to:
 Jerry Bradley (poet) (born 1948), American poet and professor
 Jerry Bradley (music executive) (born 1940), American music executive and producer
 Jerry Bradley (Canadian football) (born 1945), American-born Canadian football player